Jaymie is a male given name. Notable people with this name include:

 Jaymie Graham (born 1983), Australian rules football player
 Jaymie Haycocks (born 1983), English squash player
 Jaymie Ireland, drummer of Irish band Ooberman
 Jaymie Jones, member of American band Mulberry Lane
 Jaymie Matthews (born 1958), Canadian astrophysicist, asteroseismologist, and populariser of science